is a Japanese manga series written and illustrated by Kaiji Kawaguchi. It is about a resourceful boy, Genichiro Ryu, as he survives a series of natural disasters and collapse of the economy in Japan set in the beginning of the 21st century. It was serialized in Shogakukan's Big Comic from 2002 to 2008.

It was followed by a second part, serialized in the same magazine from 2008 to 2010. The series was adapted into a 2-episode anime television special produced by Madhouse in 2006.

In 2006, A Spirit of The Sun received the 51st Shogakukan Manga Award for the General category. As well as the Grand Prize of the 10th Japan Media Arts Festival.

Plot
In Japan, the series of earthquakes beginning on August 10, 2002 caused the explosion of Mount Fuji, and its consequences: a Japan, where half of the population has perished and whose main island, Honshū, is cut in two, and which must to survive appeal to the United States and China. Years later; two Japans coexist and many Japanese live as refugees in makeshift camps around the world. The south area is controlled by the United States, and the north area by China, with capitals in Fukuoka and Sapporo, respectively. Draws "abandoners" scattered all over the world.

Media

Manga
A Spirit of the Sun, written and illustrated by Kaiji Kawaguchi, was serialized in Shogakukan's Big Comic from 2002 to 2008, with its chapters collected in seventeen tankōbon volumes, released from May 30, 2003 to February 29, 2008. A second part, was serialized in the same magazine from 2008 to 2010. Its chapters were collected in nine tankōbon volumes, released from  June 30, 2008 to January 28, 2011.

Volume list

1st part

2nd part

Anime
Directed by Masayuki Kojima and written by Tatsuhiko Urahata, Madhouse produced a 2-episode TV special adaptation of  the manga, which was shown on WOWOW on September 17 and September 18, 2006. The ending theme is "The Power" performed by Kanon.

In North America, Maiden Japan licensed the anime in 2018.

Reception
In 2006, A Spirit of The Sun, along with Rainbow: Nisha Rokubō no Shichinin by Masasumi Kakizaki and George Abe, received the 51st Shogakukan Manga Award for the General category. It also received the Grand Prize for the Manga Category at the 10th Japan Media Arts Festival in 2006.

References

External links
 Official Madhouse Studios A Spirit of The Sun website 
  
 Official WOWOW A Spirit of The Sun website 
 

2002 manga
Kaiji Kawaguchi
Madhouse (company)
Maiden Japan
Seinen manga
Shogakukan manga
Winners of the Shogakukan Manga Award for general manga
Wowow original programming